Yathra is a 1985 Indian Malayalam-language romantic drama film written and directed by Balu Mahendra. The film stars Mammootty and Shobana, while Adoor Bhasi, Thilakan and Alummoodan play supporting roles. The film tells a fictional story but is built upon the human rights violations by the police and the prison authorities in India during the emergency of 1975–1977, when the fundamental rights of the citizens were suspended. It is an adaptation of the 1977 Japanese classic The Yellow Handkerchief.

The film was produced by Joseph Abraham under the banner Prakkattu Films. The film was his third production venture, the others being Olangal and Oomakkuyil. The film features original songs composed by Ilaiyaraaja, with lyrics written by P. Bhaskaran and O. N. V. Kurup. The cinematography of the film was done by Balu Mahendra himself, while the editing was done by D. Vasu.

Yathra was released on 20 September 1985 and received critical acclaim. It was a box office success and had a theatrical run of over a year. The film won three Kerala State Film Awards: Best Film with Popular Appeal and Aesthetic Value, Best Director for Balu Mahendra and the Special Jury Award for Mammootty. Shobana was nominated for Best Actress category at the Filmfare Awards South. The film was remade by Balu Mahendra in Telugu as Nireekshana (1986) and in Tamil as Adhu Oru Kana Kaalam (2005).

Plot
The story unfolds as Unnikrishnan (Mammootty), a convict, now free from jail, tells his tragic love story to his fellow passengers in a school bus. An orphan and a forest officer by profession, he falls in love with a local woman, Thulasi, during his stay at a forest area. They decided to get married, and he sets off to tell his best friend about his plans. On his way back, the police arrest him as a suspected criminal, who looks similar to Unnikrishnan. There he accidentally kills a policeman and gets life imprisonment. During his early days at jail, he writes a letter to Thulasi asking her to forget him. When his prison term was about to complete, he writes a letter to see if she waits for him. After long years of torment in the jail he goes to meet Thulasi. Does she still wait for him? That's the question of his fellow passengers, too. At the end, she does wait for him, and welcomes him with lamps, and a face, wet with tears of joy, and sadness, together. Thus, the film ends off happily, with everyone shedding tears of joy.

Cast

Mammootty as Unnikrishnan
Shobhana as Thulasi 
Adoor Bhasi as Priest 
Thilakan as Jailer
Nahas
Sunny
 Achankunju as Joseph 
Kunchan as Devasiya
Azeez as SI K.G Nair 
Alummoodan as Paramu Nair 
K. P. A. C. Sunny as District Forest Officer 
T. R. Omana
Anju as Girl in the bus 
Manohar
P. R. Menon
Baby Preethi
K. R. Savithri
Mounika 
Master Vimala

Reception
The film was released on 20 September 1985. According to a trade analysis by Sreedhar Pillai for India Today, the film grossed around 0.19 crores from the releasing centers, becoming the highest grossing Malayalam film of the year. Yathra completed a 120-day run in theatres. The film ran for more than 50 days in a center in Coimbatore.

Accolades

Soundtrack
The music was composed by Ilaiyaraaja and the lyrics were written by P. Bhaskaran and O. N. V. Kurup. The song "Thanannam Thannanam" is inspired by My Favorite Things from the 1959 Rodgers and Hammerstein musical The Sound of Music.

References

External links
 

1985 films
1980s Malayalam-language films
Films directed by Balu Mahendra
Malayalam remakes of Telugu films
Films scored by Ilaiyaraaja
1985 romantic drama films
Indian romantic drama films